The Homeland Party (Ḥizb el-Waṭan) or El-Watan Party was a centrist party in Tunisia, that was launched on 19 February 2011 and officially licensed on 9 March 2011. 

It was founded by Mohamed Jegham, former minister of trade and tourism, Ahmed Friaa, former minister of the interior in the Government of Mohamed Ghannouchi, and ten other leaders. Both Jegham and Friaa come from the ranks of the old dominant party Constitutional Democratic Rally, sustaining the Zine El Abidine Ben Ali regime. On 13 June 2011, Friaa announced his resignation from the party to clear the way for younger politicians.

References

External links
Website of Al-Watan Party

2011 establishments in Tunisia
2013 disestablishments in Tunisia
Centrist parties in Tunisia
Defunct political parties in Tunisia
Destourian parties
Political parties disestablished in 2013
Political parties established in 2011